Hjalmar Krag (2 July 1867 – 25 April 1954) was a Norwegian military officer, businessman and sports official.

Krag was born in Vestre Aker to director of the Norwegian Directorate of Public Roads, Hans Hagerup Krag, and Anna Marie Pedersen. He married Claudine Emilie Heiberg in 1896.

He graduated as military officer in 1889, and from the Norwegian Military College in 1893. He served as adjutant to Haakon VII of Norway from 1905 to 1908. From 1909 to 1912 he lectured at the Norwegian Military Academy. He chaired Norges Landsforbund for Idræt from 1919 to 1925. He was decorated Knight, First Class of the Order of St. Olav in 1935.

References

1860s births
1954 deaths
Military personnel from Oslo
Norwegian Military College alumni
Academic staff of the Norwegian Military Academy
Norwegian Army personnel
Norwegian sports executives and administrators